Enemies Like This is the fourth LP by the New York City dance-punk band Radio 4. It was released on May 16, 2006.

Critical reception

Enemies Like This was met with "mixed or average" reviews from critics. At Metacritic, which assigns a weighted average rating out of 100 to reviews from mainstream publications, this release received an average score of 55 based on 16 reviews.

Writing for AllMusic, Rob Theakston wrote: "While there are glimpses of this progression on Enemies Like This, they're all too few and far between to merit this album as anything but stagnant." At Drowned in Sound, Rob Webb gave the album a three out of ten, explaining "Radio 4's latest LP would have been welcomed with open arms by those in search of a quick 'n' dirty punk-funk fix. But now, with the genre oversaturated beyond belief, bands need to produce something special and original to stand out from the crowd. Radio 4 fail to do that."

Track listing

References

2006 albums
Radio 4 (band) albums
Astralwerks albums